Para-Scientology (or Parascientology) is a branch of Scientology which deals with all things unknown.

L. Ron Hubbard, founder of the Church of Scientology, defined it this way in the book Scientology: The Fundamentals of Thought:
"Para-Scientology includes all of the uncertainties and unknown territories of life which have not been completely explored and explained."

Hubbard sometimes used the term to differentiate between things that he considered facts and absolute certainties, and things that were still partially undetermined and on the cutting edge of Scientology research.
One such example can be found in Hubbard's book Scientology: A New Slant on Life:
"In Para-Scientology, there is some evidence that the stomach once produced sufficient life energy to motivate the body without any further 'food', but the body of man and beasts in general is not equipped so today, and of that we are very certain".

On other occasions, Hubbard used the term to simply designate basic Scientology concepts that were not fully grasped by beginning Scientologists (pre-clears), and must remain "Para-Scientological" to that person until he or she accepts them as fact:
"Some of the classified bodies of data which fall in Para-Scientology are: Dianetics, incidents on the "wholetrack", the immortality of Man, the existence of God, engrams containing pain and unconsciousness and yet all perception, prenatals, clears, character, and many other things which, even when closely and minutely observed, still are not certain things to those who observe them. Such things have relative truth".

Para-Scientology was also a Hubbard lecture recorded in the 1950s but only released in 2002 as part of the Classic Lecture Series by the Church of Scientology. It focuses specifically on so-called "paranormal" subjects from a Scientological perspective, such as witches, ghouls, demons and "the nasty problem of werewolves".

Critical views
George Malko, in his book Scientology: The Now Religion, sees the differentiation between Scientology and Para-Scientology as tenuous and relative. He writes:
The notion of a Scientology and a Para-Scientology confounds only because with continued development of various avenues of thinking, it became increasingly difficult to separate what was a concrete Scientological "consideration," and what represented Para-Scientology's "highly specialized system in order to observe them at all." That there is no true division between the two categories is evident from the Axioms, which represent the fundamental substance of all which Scientology believes, and which Hubbard calls "commonly held considerations". 
Malko also points out that Hubbard states in 1954's The Creation of Human Ability that the concept of "past lives" was only a theory. However, by 1960 and the publication of Have You Lived Before This Life, Hubbard was insisting past lives are not a theory,but a fact proven by experiments with his e-meter.

Professor Stephen A. Kent, in his paper The Creation of 'Religious' Scientology noted that in 1953 (before Scientology became a religion),
"Hubbard began making tentative connections between Scientology and religion. He formulated the awkward category, "Para-Scientology," in which he placed what he called "all greater or lesser uncertainties" such as 'Dianetics, incidents on the 'whole track,' the immortality of Man, the existence of God," as well as "past lives, mysterious influences, astrology, mysticism, religion, psychology, psychiatry, nuclear physics and any other science based on theory' (Hubbard, 1953c: 377). Scientology, Hubbard asserted, was the science of certainty, and Dianetics (like the other beliefs and practices that he mentioned) 'is a specialized thing based on theory which, no matter how workable, requires specialized observation'.... Presumably this distinction makes sense to some of Hubbard's followers". (Religious Studies and Theology journal, Vol.18, No.2 (December 1999)

References

External links
 Scientology Glossary
 Para-Scientology and the Knowingness of Man
Golden Era's Para-Scientology page

Scientology beliefs and practices